Kobe Bryant Boulevard is a proposed renaming of a stretch of Figueroa Street by former President of the Los Angeles City Council Herb Wesson and council member Curren Price on August 24, 2020. It would be renamed in honor of professional basketball player Kobe Bryant, who along with his daughter Gianna and seven others were killed in a helicopter crash on January 26, 2020.

The renamed street would span from Olympic Boulevard to Martin Luther King Jr. Boulevard. It would also include the Crypto.com Arena, which is home to the Los Angeles Lakers who Bryant played with throughout his entire 20-year career and is dubbed the "House that Kobe built".

On October 21, 2020, the vote to consider the proposal was delayed by the council, and a new date has yet to be stated .

History 
On August 24, 2020, Kobe Bryant Day, then-council member Herb Wesson announced that the  stretch of Figueroa Street, between Olympic and Martin Luther King Jr., would be renamed to Kobe Bryant Boulevard on Twitter. Wesson said that Bryant's "legacy [was] bigger than basketball" and that the street would be a reminder that "there is no obstacle too big and that with the #Mambamentality, anything is possible."

On October 15, the Figueroa Corridor Bid stated that they would vote to reject the bill, with their founder  Darryl Holzer stating that he was "disappointed that Curren Price and Herb Wesson didn’t discuss this proposal with any oil the leaders of the Figueroa Corridor Bid."

On October 21, 2020, the Los Angeles City Council's Public Works and Gang Reduction Committee considered moving forward with a vote to send it for consideration, but was delayed due to an extended meeting of the council. , the committee has not given a new date for the vote with Councilmember Price stating that the COVID-19 pandemic in Los Angeles had stalled the votes.

Route 
The renamed section would run down by the campus of the University of Southern California (USC) and past L.A. Live, putting the Crypto.com Arena at 1111 Kobe Bryant Boulevard. It would also include the Los Angeles Memorial Coliseum and Galen Center. The street would intersect with Chick Hearn Court, a section of 11th Street renamed for Lakers announcer Chick Hearn in 2002.

Reactions 
The reaction towards the announcement was mostly positive. Several USC students reacted positively to the announcement on Twitter. Many also liked how it would intersect Chick Hearn Court and MLK Boulevard. Some have criticized the move to rename because it would erase some of the street's history with it, as it would be renaming a part of José Figueroa's history as a governor of Alta California.

References 

Streets in Los Angeles
Kobe Bryant
Venues of the 2028 Summer Olympics
Proposed roads in the United States